Terry Anthony Tata (born April 24, 1940) is a former Major League Baseball (MLB) umpire. His MLB career began when the National League purchased his contract from the Triple-A International League on March 21, 1973. It ended in 1999.

Career
During his career, Tata officiated four World Series, seven National League Championship Series and three All-Star games. He also officiated in five no-hitters, including being the home plate umpire for two: Phil Niekro's on August 5, 1973  and Tom Seaver's on June 16, 1978. Tata wore uniform number 19 for most of his career.

Tata appeared on the television program What's My Line? on June 11, 1961, where he was presented as being the youngest umpire in "organized baseball." He was 21 years old at the time and stated that he worked in the Northern League which incorporated, he said on the program, "Minnesota, the Dakotas, Canada, and Wisconsin." The panelists were able to discern his occupation.

Personal life
Tata is married to his wife Janice, and they live in Cheshire, Connecticut.

On June 22, 1993, Tata was drugged and robbed in his room in Burlingame, California. After working second base in that evening’s game between the San Diego Padres and the San Francisco Giants at Candlestick Park, he invited a woman up to his room for a drink. She slipped a tranquilizer into his glass and made off with a Rolex watch, a gold bracelet, two World Series rings, and $500 in cash.

See also 

 List of Major League Baseball umpires

References

External links
 Retrieved on 2013-10-15
Retrosheet.org

1940 births
Living people
Major League Baseball umpires
Sportspeople from Waterbury, Connecticut